Becquigny may refer to the following places in France:

 Becquigny, Aisne, a commune in the department of Aisne
 Becquigny, Somme, a commune in the department of Somme